Brotherhood, an American television drama series created by Blake Masters, premiered on July 9, 2006 on the cable network Showtime in the United States. It ended its first season on September 24, 2006. The show's second season debuted on September 30, 2007 and ended on December 2, 2007.
The show's third and final season premiered on November 2, 2008 and concluded on December 21, 2008. There are eleven episodes in the first season, ten in the second, and eight in the third twenty-nine episodes aired, in total. The episodes are approximately 50 minutes long each.

Brotherhood is set in Providence, Rhode Island and centers on the Irish-American Caffee brothers, who hail from a fictional working-class neighborhood known as "The Hill". Tommy Caffee (Jason Clarke) is a respected local politician; he is a member of the Rhode Island House of Representatives. Michael Caffee (Jason Isaacs) is a professional criminal who is involved with the Irish Mob of New England.
Throughout the series, the brothers' professional and private lives are intertwined.

The first and second seasons have been released on DVD in Region 1 by CBS Home Entertainment (distributed by Paramount).

The episode titles are references to religious texts for the first season and Bob Dylan lyrics for the second season. The referenced text is written in italics below the title (for the Bible references, the King James Version is used). The episode titles for the third season are paraphrased quotes from Shakespeare plays.

Series overview

Episodes

Season 1 (2006)

Season 2 (2007)

Season 3 (2008)

References

General

Specific

External links

Lists of American crime drama television series episodes